BC Apolonia Fier is an Albanian basketball team that plays in the Albanian A1 Basketball League. The club was founded in 1925 as part of the multi disciplinary KS Apolonia.

References

Apolonia
Sport in Fier
Basketball teams established in 1925